Obsession is a 2022 Nigerian movie Written by Adelarin Awotedu,  produced by Vincent Tobi and directed by Chidiebere Nwosu under the production company of VNation Pictures  The film stars Mercy Aigbe, Shaffy Bello, Muna Abii, Benedicta Gafah and Gideon Okeke

Synopsis 
The movie revolves around a couple, John and Ashley, whose their home became unsettled because of their new neighbour. Ashley tried to befriend the neighbor unknown to her that she is suffering from psychological problem.

Premiere 
The movie was premiered on Sunday, March 20, 2022, at Blue Pictures Cinema, Ikeja, Lagos and also in Ghana

Cast 

 Gideon Okeke
 Benedicta Gaffah
 Munachi Abii
 Mercy Aigbe,
 Shaffy Bello

References 

2022 films
Nigerian drama films
English-language Nigerian films
2022 drama films